Rolo is a male Spanish given name or nickname. It may refer to the following notable people:
Judit Rolo Marichal (born 1990), Spanish Paralympic swimmer 
Rolo Puente, stagename of Rolando Pardo Dominguez (1939 – 2011), Argentine comedian and actor
 Lord Bloody Wog Rolo, nickname of Rolo Mestman Tapier (1945–2007), Argentine-born Australian activist
Rolo Villar, Argentine radio host

Fictional Characters 
 Rolo Lamperouge, a fictional character from the anime series Code Geass

See also

Rola (name)
Rolo (disambiguation)
Roro (name)

Spanish masculine given names